The House in the South is a 1975 Mexican drama film directed by Sergio Olhovich. It was entered into the 9th Moscow International Film Festival.

Cast
 David Reynoso as Don Augusto
 Helena Rojo as Elena
 Salvador Sánchez as Genaro
 Rodrigo Puebla as Cosme
 Patricia Reyes Spíndola as María
 Aurora Clavel as Jacinta
 José Chávez as El Gordo (as José Chávez Trowe)
 Enrique Lucero as Ramón
 Farnesio de Bernal as Cura
 José Carlos Ruiz as Tomás
 Ricardo Fuentes as Ingeniero Torres

References

External links
 

1975 films
1975 drama films
Mexican drama films
1970s Spanish-language films
1970s Mexican films